Sceloporus omiltemanus, the southern cleft spiny lizard or southern cleft lizard, is a species of lizard in the family Phrynosomatidae. It is endemic to Mexico.

References

Sceloporus
Fauna of the Sierra Madre del Sur
Endemic reptiles of Mexico
Reptiles described in 1890
Taxa named by Albert Günther